James Ritchie (May 12, 1815 - March 16, 1873) was an American teacher and politician, who served as the fifth Mayor of Roxbury, Massachusetts in 1855, and as a member of the Massachusetts Governor's Council.

Death
Ritchie drowned in the sinking of the steamboat Grace Darling off Duxbury, Massachusetts. His body was never found.

References

Bibliography

 History of the First Church in Roxbury, Massachusetts, 1630-1904 By Walter Eliot Thwing (1908).
 Memorials of the Class of 1835, Harvard University: Prepared on Behalf of the Class Secretary by Harvard College Class of 1835 (1886).
 The Memorial History of Boston: Including Suffolk County, Massachusetts. 1630-1880. Justin Winsor (1881).

External links

 

1815 births
1873 deaths
Accidental deaths in Massachusetts
Harvard University alumni
People from Canton, Massachusetts
Members of the Massachusetts Governor's Council
Mayors of Roxbury, Massachusetts
Deaths due to shipwreck at sea
19th-century American politicians